The Senedd Commission is the corporate body for the Senedd of Wales. The Commission is responsible for ensuring the property, staff and services are provided for the Senedd. The Commission consists of the Presiding Officer and four Members from different political parties, who each have different portfolios of work. The Commission is supported by staff in the Commission and Support Service. Prior to 2020, the body was known as the National Assembly for Wales Commission.

Role of the Commission
The Government of Wales Act 2006 provided the National Assembly for Wales with significant new powers to legislate, and strengthens its scrutiny role. It also creates a legally separate Welsh Government and a Corporate Body, known as the National Assembly for Wales Commission (Assembly Commission) which has responsibility for the provision of property, staff and services to support the Assembly Members. The Commission consists of the Presiding Officer and four other Members nominated by the main political parties. The staff of the Commission are employees of the Commission and are headed by the Chief Executive and Clerk to the Assembly.

The Commission's duty, as defined in the Government of Wales Act 2006, is to provide the “property, staff and services required for the Senedd's purposes”. In practice, this means that it is the Commission's responsibility to:

 acquire, hold or dispose of any property on behalf of the Senedd; 
 make arrangements to pay Members and provide their pensions and allowances and to employ Senedd staff; and 
 act in an appropriate and necessary way to provide the services required for the Senedd to do its work.

Schedule 2 of the Government of Wales Act 2006 allows the Commission to promote public awareness of the current or future electoral system for the Senedd. It also empowers the Commission to promote public awareness of the current or any pending system of devolved government in Wales. The Act allows this to take place via the use of education or information programmes and by making grants available to other bodies or persons to carry out such programmes.

After each financial year, the Senedd Commission must publish an annual report. This report must outline how the Commission has fulfilled its role and exercised its functions during the financial year, and must be laid before the Senedd. The Commission is also required to produce annual accounts for audit by the Auditor General for Wales.

The Commission

The Senedd Commission consists of the Llywydd, plus four other Members of the Senedd, one nominated by each of the four party groups represented by the Senedd. The Commissioners are Suzy Davies MS, Joyce Watson MS, Rhun ap Iorwerth MS and David J Rowlands MS.

The role of the Commission is to set strategic aims and objectives and consider performance, agree standards and values, oversee change, encourage innovation and enterprise for the National Senedd.

To help achieve these aims, the Commissioners have special responsibility for certain aspects of the Senedd's work. This allows a great deal of work to take place outside of formal Commission meetings and positive working relationships to be developed with staff.

Their role is to ensure that the Senedd has enough resources (both in terms of staff and infrastructure) to work effectively. The Commissioners are also responsible for overseeing Senedd Members’ pay and allowances.

The Senedd Commission has further responsibilities to promote public awareness of the devolved government in Wales as well as the current and future electoral system.

Commission for the Third Assembly (2007–2011)

Commission for the Fourth Assembly (2011–2016)

Commission for the Fifth Assembly / Senedd (2016–2021)

Commission for the Sixth Senedd (2021–Present)

Membership

The Government of Wales Act 2006 maintains that membership of the Senedd Commission will include the Presiding Officer and four other Senedd Members. Standing Order 3.3 sets out the arrangement for the appointment of the four other Senedd Members, and states that there will not be more than one member (other than the Presiding Officer) from the same political group.

Policies
A number of documents were approved by the Shadow Commission with the intention that they should be implemented as soon as is possible after the establishment of the Assembly Commission following the May 2007 elections.

The policies, which are currently under development, are:

 Statement of Practices and Procedures for the Assembly Commission
 Equality of Opportunity
 Sustainable Development Policy
 Health and Safety Policy
 Welsh Language Scheme
 Corporate Governance Framework
 Financial Standards
 Staff Code of Conduct
 Public Interest Disclosure Policy
 Records Management policy
 Freedom of Information Publication Scheme
 Procurement Policy
 Risk Management Strategy
 IT Security Policy
 Business Continuity Plan

Chief Executive and Clerk of the Senedd
The most senior civil servant within the Assembly was known as the Clerk to the Assembly until 2007 when the post was expanded and renamed as Chief Executive and Clerk to the Assembly. It was renamed the Chief Executive and Clerk of the Senedd after the changes to the name of the legislature.

The post was created to reflect the growing powers of the Assembly following the Government of Wales Act 2006. From May 2007, the Chief Executive and Clerk will lead an organisation independent of the Welsh Assembly Government. They are responsible for ensuring that the Assembly is provided with the property, staff and services that it requires and to help develop an Assembly that inspires confidence and has a reputation within Wales and beyond for accessible and efficient democracy.

 John Lloyd, (1999 to 2001)
 Paul Silk, (2001 to April 2007)
 Claire Clancy, (February 2007 – April 2017).
 Manon Antoniazzi, (April 2017 – present)

References

External links
 Senedd Commission website

Senedd